Capital of Culture or City of Culture may refer to:
 European Capital of Culture, formerly European City of Culture, title awarded annually in the European Union
 American Capital of Culture, in the Americas, title awarded annually by American Capital of Culture Organization, an NGO
 Arab Capital of Culture, in the Arab League, title awarded annually under the supervision of UNESCO
 Turkic Capital of Culture, in the Turkic speaking areas, title awarded annually by TURKSOY
 UK City of Culture, title awarded quadrennially, for the first time in 2013
 City of Culture of Galicia, complex of cultural buildings in Santiago de Compostela, Spain
 The Pool (play), subtitled City of Culture?, 2004 play